Maepo station is a railway station on the Gyeongbu Line in Bugang-myeon, Sejong City, South Korea.

Railway stations in Sejong